The 1956 Syracuse Orangemen football team represented Syracuse University in the 1956 NCAA University Division football season. The Orangemen were led by eighth-year head coach Ben Schwartzwalder and played their home games at Archbold Stadium in Syracuse, New York. Syracuse finished the regular season with a record of 7–1, and were ranked 8th in both final polls. They were awarded the Lambert Trophy, which signified them as champions of the East. Syracuse was invited to the 1957 Cotton Bowl, where they were defeated by TCU.

The team was led by unanimous All-American halfback Jim Brown. Brown set school records in average yards-per-carry (6.2), single-season rushing yards (986), single-game rushing touchdowns (6, vs. Colgate), and most points scored in a game (43, vs. Colgate). He was drafted sixth overall in the 1957 NFL Draft and went on to become one of the most celebrated professional athletes of all time.

Schedule

Roster
HB Jim Brown, Sr.

Team players in the NFL

Awards and honors
 Jim Brown, unanimous first team All-American (AFCA, AP, UP, INS, CP, NEA, WCF, FWAA)
 Jim Brown, Cotton Bowl Classic co-Most Valuable Player

References

Syracuse
Syracuse Orange football seasons
Lambert-Meadowlands Trophy seasons
Syracuse Orangemen football